is a Buddhist temple of the Kokutai-ji branch of Rinzai school of Buddhism in Fukuyama, Hiroshima Prefecture, Japan. This temple was built by the priest Kakushin in 1273. Afterwards, it was revived by Ankokuji Ekei in 1579, though it remained in decline. This temple is classified as an Important Cultural Property.

See also 
 For an explanation of terms concerning Japanese Buddhism, Japanese Buddhist art, and Japanese Buddhist temple architecture, see the Glossary of Japanese Buddhism.

External links
Ankoku-ji in a tourism guide

Religious organizations established in the 1270s
Kokutai-ji temples
Buddhist temples in Hiroshima Prefecture
Fukuyama, Hiroshima
1270s establishments in Japan
1273 establishments in Asia